The 1899 Arkansas Cardinals football team represented the University of Arkansas during the 1899 college football season. The Cardinals played four intercollegiate football games and one game against a high school team from Joplin, Missouri.  They compiled a 3–1–1 record and outscored their opponents by a combined total of 37 to 21. The team's one loss came against Oklahoma by an 11–5 score.

Colbert Searles was the team's football coach in 1899 and 1900. He was a graduate of Wesleyan University and a professor of romance languages. In the summer of 1901, he left the University of Arkansas to accept a position as a professor at Stanford University.

The team's roster in 1899 included the following players: Oscar Briggs; Wm. A. Freeman; H. H. Ham; Charles D. Harrison; DeMatt Henderson; Wilburn D. Hobbs; Frank D. James; J. K. McCall; Percy B. Meyer; Chester C. Sloan; Carl C. Smith; James Vanderventer; and Ashton Vincenheller.

Schedule

References

Arkansas
Arkansas Razorbacks football seasons
Arkansas Cardinals football